Majursahi is a village of  Koksara Block in Dharmagarh Sub-Division in Kalahandi District of Odisha State. This village  comes under Phupagaon Panchayat of  Kokasara Tehasil in Kalahandi District. It also comes under Kasibahal RI circle. Majursahi is 6.5 km distance from Koksara and 60 km distance from its District Headquarters Bhawanipatna.

Demographics 
As per the Population Census 2011, there are total 192 families residing in the village Majursahi. The total population of Majursahi is 714 out of which 338 are males and 376 are females thus the Average Sex Ratio of Majursahi is 1,112.

The population of Children of age 0–6 years in Majursahi village is 113 which is 16% of the total population. There are 52 male children and 61 female children between the age 0–6 years. Thus as per the Census 2011 the Child Sex Ratio of Majursahi is 1,173 which is greater than Average Sex Ratio (1,112) of Majursahi village.

As per the Census 2011, the literacy rate of Majursahi is 54.7%. Thus Majursahi village has higher literacy rate compared to 50.9% of Kalahandi district. The male literacy rate is 70.28% and the female literacy rate is 40.63% in Majursahi village.

Gallery

Education  

 Schools Near By Majursahi
 Majursahi Primary & Upper Primary School 
 Saraswati Sishu Mandir, Kusumkhunti
 Phupagaon M.E school
 Phupagaon N  S C High School

 Colleges Nearby By Majursahi
 Panchayat Samiti Degree College, Koksara
 Ladugaon Higher Secondary School, Ladugaon
 Indravati Degree  Collage, Jaipatna
 L.  A. +2 Junior College, Behera

References

External links
 http://schools.yorakul.com/kalahandi/21260905801/majursahi-u.p.s..html
 http://www.icbse.com/schools/majursahi-u-p-s/21260905801
 http://www.odishahelpline.com/MAJURSAHI-village-PHUPGAON-panchayat-KOKSARA-block-KALAHANDI-district-ODISHA050237180232130111236049
 http://www.odishahelpline.com/schools-MAJURSAHI-UPS-PHUPGAON-KALAHANDI-district-ODISHA059082117025164142022205
 https://allindiafacts.com/school/odisha/kalahandi/koksara/21260905801.html
 http://www.neighbourhoodinfo.co.in/school-detail/Majursahi-U-p-s--School-21260905801
 http://acadym.com/School/1279789/MAJURSAHI-UPS-MAJURSAHI-KALAHANDI
 https://vidhyant.com/schools/1880281/Majursahi-U-P-S
 http://www.codesofindia.com/school/Orissa/Kalahandi/Majursahi/Majursahi-U-P-S-.html

Villages in Kalahandi district